(Expectation), Op. 17, is a one-act monodrama in four scenes by Arnold Schoenberg to a libretto by . Composed in 1909, it was not premiered until 6 June 1924 in Prague conducted by Alexander Zemlinsky with Marie Gutheil-Schoder as the soprano. The opera takes the unusual form of a monologue for solo soprano accompanied by a large orchestra. In performance, it lasts for about half an hour. It is sometimes paired with Béla Bartók's opera Bluebeard's Castle (1911), as the two works were roughly contemporary and share similar psychological themes. Schoenberg described Erwartung, saying "the aim is to represent in slow motion everything that occurs during a single second of maximum spiritual excitement, stretching it out to half an hour."

Philip Friedheim has described  as Schoenberg's "only lengthy work in an athematic style", where no musical material returns once stated over the course of 426 measures. In his analysis of the structure, one indication of the complexity of the music is that the first scene of over 30 bars contains 9 meter changes and 16 tempo changes. Herbert Buchanan has countered this description of the work as "athematic", and the general impression of it as "atonal", in his own analysis.

The musicologist Charles Rosen has said that , along with Berg's Wozzeck and Stravinsky's The Rite of Spring, is among the "impregnable" "great monuments of modernism."

Performance history 
 had its British premiere on 9 January 1931, with the BBC Symphony Orchestra conducted by the composer.

It was the first live opera shown on Times Square in New York City in a production by Robin Rhode in November 2015 (2 performances).

Roles
 The Woman (soprano)

Synopsis
Time: Night
Place: A forest
A woman is in an apprehensive state as she searches for her lover. In the darkness, she comes across what she first thinks is a body, but then realises is a tree-trunk. She is frightened and becomes more anxious as she cannot find the man she is looking for. She then finds a dead body, and sees that it is her lover. She calls out for assistance, but there is no response. She tries to revive him, and addresses him as if he were still alive, angrily charging him with being unfaithful to her. She then asks herself what she is to do with her life, as her lover is now dead. Finally, she wanders off alone into the night.

Instrumentation
's score calls for:

Recordings (abridged list)
 Columbia: Dorothy Dow; New York Philharmonic-Symphony Orchestra; Dimitri Mitropoulos, conductor (1951)
 Orfeo: Magda László; Symphonieorchester des Bayerischen Rundfunks; Hermann Scherchen, conductor (1955)
 Wergo: Helga Pilarczyk; North West German Philharmonic; Hermann Scherchen, conductor (1960)
 Columbia: Helga Pilarczyk; Washington Opera Society Orchestra; Robert Craft, conductor (p. 1963)
 Q Disc: Dorothy Dorow; Concertgebouw Orchestra; Sir Bernard Haitink, conductor (1975)
 CRI: Susan Davenny Wyner; Orchestra of the 20th Century; Arthur Weisberg, conductor (1975)
 CBS: Janis Martin; BBC Symphony Orchestra; Pierre Boulez, conductor (1977)
 Decca: Anja Silja; Wiener Philharmoniker; Christoph von Dohnányi, conductor (1979)
 Philips: Jessye Norman; Metropolitan Opera Orchestra; James Levine, conductor (1989)
 EMI Classics: Phyllis Bryn-Julson; City of Birmingham Symphony Orchestra; Sir Simon Rattle, conductor (1993)
 Teldec: Alessandra Marc; Sächsische Staatskapelle Dresden; Giuseppe Sinopoli, conductor (1996)
 KOCH International Classics: Anja Silja; Philharmonia Orchestra; Robert Craft, conductor (2000)
 Chandos: Sara Jakubiak; Bergen Philharmonic Orchestra; Edward Gardner, conductor (2020)

References

Further reading

External links
Erwartung at the Arnold Schoenberg Centre

1909 operas
1924 operas
Atonal compositions by Arnold Schoenberg
German-language operas
Operas
Monodrama
One-act operas
Operas by Arnold Schoenberg
Expressionist music